The Horsepasture River is an  National Wild and Scenic river in the U.S. states of North Carolina and South Carolina. The river rises in Jackson County, North Carolina, and flows through the Jocassee Gorges area and ends at Lake Jocassee in South Carolina. Some of the land over which the river flows is part of the Pisgah National Forest, making it accessible to the public.

North Carolina designated  of the river as Horsepasture State Natural River in 1985, including it in the state's Natural and Scenic Rivers System.  The State River is between NC-281 and the state line.

The Horsepasture River features several significant waterfalls in close proximity to one another. The named falls are:

Drift Falls
Turtleback Falls
Rainbow Falls
Hidden Falls
Stairway Falls
Sidepocket Falls
Windy Falls

See also
Gorges State Park provides the only easy, legal access to the river's waterfalls.

References

External links

Rivers of North Carolina
Rivers of South Carolina
Protected areas established in 1985
Pisgah National Forest
Protected areas of Jackson County, North Carolina
Protected areas of Transylvania County, North Carolina
Protected areas of Oconee County, South Carolina
Tributaries of the Savannah River
Rivers of Jackson County, North Carolina
Rivers of Transylvania County, North Carolina
Rivers of Oconee County, South Carolina
Wild and Scenic Rivers of the United States
1985 establishments in the United States